Kalibata is a kelurahan (literally "ward", in this case the smallest unit in the sub-division of urban areas), part of Pancoran which is itself a subdistrict of South Jakarta, Indonesia. The ward name comes from "kali" and "Bata" meaning river and the shoes factory plant that was located there during Dutch's occupation.

Cemetery
Kalibata is noteworthy as the location of the Kalibata Cemetery or "Heroes' Cemetery", where veterans of the Indonesian National Revolution and other prominent people are buried - including National Heroes of Indonesia - roughly the Indonesian equivalent to the American Arlington National Cemetery.

Australia's Prime Ministers Rudd and Gillard paid visits to lay wreaths at the cemetery.

Kalibata City
The 12-hectare superblock in South Jakarta, Kalibata City applies the concept of Affordable Public Residential Superblock that consists of Kalibata Residences, Kalibata Regency and Green Palace Apartment. The superblock features Kalibata City Square, a state of the art mall that will be the heart of Kalibata City, as well as other amenities that include schools, offices and commercial areas. The 7,000 sqm Kalibata City Forest, which serves as Outbound Adventure Park, is designed to be the lung of the superblock.

Residents Community
Several residents of Kalibata City formed an organization called Komunitas Warga Kalibata City (KWKC) to pursue their objectives in advocating against unlawful and illegal actions by the apartment management. On 10 April 2016, KWKC launched its website  consisting features such as news, events and forum.

Controversy

Murder case
On 1 October 2013, there was a murder case in Ebony tower, one of the kalibata city complex tower. On 9 October 2013, two people allegedly have connection to the murder are arrested.

Residents protest
In February 2015, dozens of residents staged a protest by walking around the apartment buildings. They protest because the apartments’ maintenance fees have increased by 43 percent and the apartment management's lack of transparency. Also there are many criminal acts in this apartment complex, like murder, drug abuse and robbery.

Prostitution
On 26 April 2015, Kalibata City is allegedly linked to the online prostitution practice. The Jakarta Police arrested members of a prostitution ring operating out of the Kalibata City after discovering that the group had been attracting customers through Twitter.

References

Districts of Jakarta
Cemeteries in Jakarta